Hour was an English-language urban news weekly paper published in Montreal, Quebec, Canada, by Communications Voir. Its president-publisher was Pierre Paquet, the editor-in-chief was Kevin Laforest. The first issue was published on February 4, 1993. It catered to Montreal's anglophone community and was published every Thursday. The news features "expose readers to new ideas and alternative policies". News coverage centered on film, arts, and nightlife. In 2011, the magazine was renamed Hour Community.

On May 2, 2012, editor Kevin Laforest announced that Hour Community would cease operations, following its last issue on May 3.

See also
List of newspapers in Canada

References

External links
 Homepage

1996 establishments in Quebec
2012 disestablishments in Quebec
Alternative weekly newspapers published in Canada
Defunct newspapers published in Quebec
Defunct weekly newspapers
English-language newspapers published in Quebec
Newspapers published in Montreal
Newspapers established in 1996
Publications disestablished in 2012